3406 Omsk, provisional designation , is a background asteroid from the central regions of the asteroid belt, approximately  in diameter. It was discovered on 21 February 1969, by Soviet astronomer Bella Burnasheva at the Crimean Astrophysical Observatory on the Crimean peninsula in Nauchnij. The possibly metallic M/X-type asteroid has a rotation period of 7.3 hours. It was named for the Russia city of Omsk.

Orbit and classification 

Omsk is a non-family asteroid from the main belt's background population. It orbits the Sun in the central asteroid belt at a distance of 2.4–3.2 AU once every 4 years and 8 months (1,708 days; semi-major axis of 2.8 AU). Its orbit has an eccentricity of 0.13 and an inclination of 8° with respect to the ecliptic.

The body's observation arc begins with its official discovery observation at Nauchnij in February 1969.

Physical characteristics 

In the SMASS classification, Omsk is an X-type asteroid. It has also been characterized as a metallic M-type and carbonaceous C-type by the Wide-field Infrared Survey Explorer (WISE) and Pan-STARRS, respectively.

Rotation period 

In May 2007, a rotational lightcurve of Omsk was obtained from photometric observations at the Mount Tarana Observatory  in Bathurst, Australia. Lightcurve analysis gave a well-defined rotation period of 7.275 hours with a brightness amplitude of 0.28 magnitude.

Diameter and albedo 

According to the surveys carried out by the Infrared Astronomical Satellite IRAS, the Japanese Akari satellite and the NEOWISE mission of NASA's WISE telescope, Omsk measures between 13.43 and 16.59 kilometers in diameter and its surface has an albedo between 0.1569 and 0.2476.

The Collaborative Asteroid Lightcurve Link derives an albedo of 0.1619 and a diameter of 14.42 kilometers based on an absolute magnitude of 11.8.

Naming 

This minor planet was named after the Siberian city of Omsk, the discoverer's birthplace and the administrative center of Omsk Oblast, Russia. The official naming citation was published by the Minor Planet Center on 18 February 1992.

References

External links 
 Asteroid Lightcurve Database (LCDB), query form (info )
 Dictionary of Minor Planet Names, Google books
 Discovery Circumstances: Numbered Minor Planets (1)-(5000) – Minor Planet Center
 
 

003406
Discoveries by Bella A. Burnasheva
Named minor planets
003406
19690221